The 1906 Portland Beavers season was the fourth season in the history of the Portland Beavers baseball team. The 1906 team won the Pacific Coast League (PCL) pennant with a 114–58 record (.663 winning percentage). The team played its home games at Vaughn Street Park. The 1906 season was the first in which the team played under the name "Beavers", having been previously known as the "Browns" and "Giants".

The 1906 Beavers were selected in 2003 by a panel of minor league experts as the sixth best team in the PCL's 100-year history. The team was also ranked No. 31 by Minor League Baseball in its ranking of the 100 greatest minor league teams in baseball history.

The Beavers were in Oakland, California, when the 1906 San Francisco earthquake struck the coast of Northern California. The season was interrupted for five weeks after the earthquake.

The team was owned by Judge William Wallace McCredie, who later represented the State of Washington in the U.S. House of Representatives. McCredie also served as the club's president while his son, Hugh, was the business manager and his wife, Alice, managed the ticket office. His nephew Walt McCredie played in the National League, batting .324 in 1903, but joined the Portland club as player-manager in 1904 after his uncle became the owner.  Walt McCredie was both the manager and one of the starting outfielders in 1906, leading the team to the pennant while also compiling a .306 batting average.

The star of the team was outfielder Mike Mitchell. Mitchell was credited by Bill James as having one of the best outfield arms of the Deadball Era.  In 1906, he won the PCL batting championship with a .339 batting average and also led the league in home runs and slugging percentage.

Enon Califf, Ben Henderson, and "Vinegar Bill" Essick led the pitching staff. Califf, an Oregon native, compiled a 34–14 record with 40 complete games and a 2.17 earned run average (ERA) in 53 games (46 as a starter).  Henderson went 29–10 with 38 complete games and a 1.60 ERA in 41 games. Essick led the PCL with a .760 winning percentage (19 wins, 6 losses).

1906 PCL standings

Statistics

Batting 
Note: Pos = Position; G = Games played; AB = At bats; H = Hits; Avg. = Batting average; HR = Home runs; SLG = Slugging percentage

Pitching 
Note: G = Games pitched; IP = Innings pitched; W = Wins; L = Losses; PCT = Win percentage; ERA = Earned run average; SO = Strikeouts

References

Further reading
 
 

1906 in sports in Oregon
Pacific Coast League seasons